Tumbler's Green is a hamlet near the towns of Halstead and Braintree in the Braintree district, in the English county of Essex.

Other nearby settlements include Folly Green, Pattiswick, Stisted and Greenstead Green.

References 
A-Z Essex, 2010 edition. p. 15.

Hamlets in Essex
Braintree District